Copper usnate is the copper salt of usnic acid. It has been used as an antimicrobial.

References

Antimicrobials
Copper(II) compounds